A Massacre Foretold is a 2007 documentary film by Nick Higgins. The film was released 10 years after the Acteal massacre in Chiapas, Mexico, of which the film is an account.

See also 
 Acteal massacre
 A Place Called Chiapas
 Chiapas conflict
 EZLN

External links 

 
 

2007 films
Documentary films about revolutions
British documentary films
2000s Spanish-language films
Tzotzil-language films
2007 documentary films
2000s English-language films
2000s British films